Mariella Bertini (born 30 September 1958) is a former Italian wheelchair fencer who won eight medals at the Summer Paralympics.

Married to wheelchair fencer and para shooter Santo Mangano, he too, like her, winner of eight Paralympic medals between Seoul 1988 and Atlanta 1996.

See also
 Italian multiple medallists at the Summer Paralympics

References

External links
 
 Mariella Bertini at CONI

1958 births
Living people
Paralympic wheelchair fencers of Italy
Paralympic gold medalists for Italy
Paralympic silver medalists for Italy
Paralympic medalists in wheelchair fencing
Wheelchair fencers at the 1984 Summer Paralympics
Wheelchair fencers at the 1988 Summer Paralympics
Wheelchair fencers at the 1992 Summer Paralympics
Wheelchair fencers at the 1996 Summer Paralympics
Sportspeople from the Province of Pisa
Medalists at the 1988 Summer Paralympics
Medalists at the 1992 Summer Paralympics
Medalists at the 1996 Summer Paralympics